Sebarga is a parish  in Amieva, a municipality within the province and autonomous community of Asturias, in northern Spain. 

The population as of is 190 (INE 2011). The postal code is 33557.

Villages

References

Parishes in Amieva
Catholic titular sees in Africa